Pachylocerus is a genus of longhorn beetles in the subfamily Cerambycinae. Species in the genus are found only in the Oriental (Indo-Malayan) region.

List of species 
 Pachylocerus bawangensis 
 Pachylocerus corallinus 
 Pachylocerus crassicornis 
 Pachylocerus nayani 
 Pachylocerus parvus 
 Pachylocerus pilosus 
 Pachylocerus plagiatus 
 Pachylocerus sabahanus 
 Pachylocerus sulcatus 
 Pachylocerus unicolor

References

Cerambycinae
Cerambycidae genera